Anthony John Messner  (born  24 September 1939) is a former Australian  politician and government minister.

Messner was born in Melbourne and educated at a state primary school in Queensland, Pulteney Grammar School, Adelaide and the South Australian Institute of Technology.

Messner was elected as a Senator for South Australia at the 1975 election.  He was appointed Minister for Veterans' Affairs in November 1980 and held that position until the defeat of the Fraser government at the March 1983 election.  He resigned from parliament in April 1990.

Messner was Administrator of Norfolk Island from August 1997 to July 2003.  He was made a member of the Order of Australia in 2004 for "service to the Australian Parliament, to Norfolk Island as Administrator, and to the community, particularly veterans and their families".

Notes

1939 births
Living people
Liberal Party of Australia members of the Parliament of Australia
Members of the Australian Senate for South Australia
Members of the Australian Senate
Administrators of Norfolk Island
Members of the Order of Australia
University of South Australia alumni
20th-century Australian politicians